Ömer Behçet Uz (1893 – 19 May 1986) was a Turkish physician, politician, former mayor of İzmir and government minister.

Biography 

He was born in Buldan ilçe (district) of Denizli Province, Ottoman Empire in 1893. He studied in İzmir High School, which was later renamed to Atatürk High School, and in the School of Medicine of Istanbul University. After working in Istanbul, he moved to İzmir to practice pediatrics. In 1922, he founded Veremle Mücadele Derneği ("Society to Struggle Against Tuberculosis")

In 1931, he was elected as the Mayor of İzmir. In this post, he served for ten years. He was instrumental in establishing  Kültürpark, erecting the Atatürk Monument, establishing playgrounds, market squares, constructing some streets. In 1941, he was elected as a Republican People's Party (CHP) deputy from Denizli Province.

Between 9 July 1942 and 9 March 1943, he was the Minister of Commerce in the 13th government of Turkey. Between 7 August 1946 and 10 June 1948 in the 15th and the 16th government of Turkey, he was the Minister of Health and Social Security.

After the CHP lost the parliament majority in the 1950 general election, he joined the Democrat Party. Between 17 June 1954 and 9 December 1955 in the 21st government of Turkey, he was again the Minister of Health and Social Security.

He died in 1986 in Istanbul The Dr. Behçet Uz Çocuk Hospital, a children's hospital is named in his honor.

References

1893 births
People from Buldan
Istanbul University Faculty of Medicine alumni
Turkish pediatricians
Mayors of İzmir
Republican People's Party (Turkey) politicians
Deputies of Denizli
Democrat Party (Turkey, 1946–1961) politicians
Government ministers of Turkey
Health ministers of Turkey
Members of the 13th government of Turkey
Members of the 15th government of Turkey
Members of the 16th government of Turkey
Members of the 21st government of Turkey
1986 deaths